The Aéro-Club de France issued Aviators Certificates from 1909. These were internationally recognised under the Fédération Aéronautique Internationale.

French aviators' licences were issued from 1 January 1910, but by this time many aviation pioneers, e.g. Louis Blériot and the Wright brothers, had amply demonstrated their abilities and they were therefore not required to pass an examination in order to receive a licence. The first fourteen licences were awarded in alphabetical order, with Blériot being awarded Licence No. 1 and Wilbur Wright receiving No. 15 (No. 13 was not awarded); two further such 'honorary' licences were awarded subsequently and inserted into the sequence as '5bis' and '10bis'.

List
Legend

See also
Lists for other years
1909
1910
1912
1913
1914

References

Bibliography

Aviation pioneers
Lists of aviators
1911 in aviation
Aviat
Aéro-Club de France